Garakowa: Restore the World, known in Japan as , is a 2016 Japanese anime science fiction fantasy film produced by A-1 Pictures, directed by Masashi Ishihama and written by Fumihiko Shimo. Distributed by Pony Canyon, the film was released in Japan on January 9, 2016 and was streamed on Crunchyroll on January 16, 2016.

Plot
Dual and Dorothy are two programs who reside within the Box of Wisdom. Their job is to enter the various worlds containing the memories of people across many timelines, deleting worlds that become infected with viruses. One day, they come across Remo, a girl who has lost memory of who she is, who is searching for something known as the flower garden. While trying to figure out who she is, Dual and Dorothy spend time with Remo, learning to find joy in various things that they'd normally deem pointless. However, they soon begin to not only learn about what Remo's true purpose is, but also the state of the world outside of their box.

Characters

Reception
Theron Martin of Anime News Network gave the film an overall B rating, praising the film's outstanding background art and cuteness, but criticizing the story for not realizing the potential of its serious tones and being overall too condensed. Garakowa: Restore the World grossed $43,000 at the box office.

Notes

References

External links
 
 
Garakowa: Restore the World on Crunchyroll

2016 anime films
A-1 Pictures
Japanese animated fantasy films
Japanese animated science fiction films
2010s science fiction films
2016 fantasy films